"Together" is Tohoshinki's 15th Japanese single. It was released on December 19, 2007 and debuted at #2 on the Oricon Daily Charts, ending as #3 overall for the week. Together is used as the ending song for the Sanrio and Madhouse Animated Film, Cinnamoroll The Movie.

Track listing

CD
"Together"
"Together" (Kids Chorus version)
"Forever Love" (Bell'n'Snow Edit)
"Together" (Less Vocal)

DVD
"Together" (Video clip)
Off Shot Movie

Music video
The official music video was an animation featuring the TVXQ members helping out boys who are in a dance competition.

Release history

Charts

Oricon sales chart (Japan)

Korea monthly foreign albums & singles (Top 20)

References

External links
 http://toho-jp.net/

2007 singles
TVXQ songs
2007 songs
Rhythm Zone singles
Japanese film songs
Songs written for animated films